Tropidophis nigriventis, or the black-bellied dwarf boa, is a species of snake in the family Tropidophiidae. The species is endemic to Cuba.

Geographic range
T. nigriventris is found in central Cuba in Camagüey Province.

References

Further reading
Bailey JR (1937). "A Review of some Recent Tropidophis Material". Proceedings of the New England Zoological Club 16: 41–52. (Tropidophis nigriventris, new species, p. 45).

Tropidophiidae
Reptiles described in 1937
Snakes of the Caribbean
Reptiles of Cuba
Endemic fauna of Cuba